Citharichthys abbotti, the Veracruz whiff, is a species of flatfish in the large-tooth flounder family Paralichthyidae. It is endemic to the southwestern Gulf of Mexico, found on the Eastern Mexico Continental Shelf, with Veracruz to the south and the Rio Grande to the north.

It is a demersal fish that inhabits tropical waters. Like the rest of the large-tooth flounders, it has both eyes on the left side of its head.

References

Citharichthys
Fish of the Gulf of Mexico
Fish described in 1969